Robert William Wolcott  (born September 8, 1973) is an American former professional baseball pitcher. He played all or part of five seasons in Major League Baseball (MLB) for the Seattle Mariners (1995–97), Arizona Diamondbacks (1998), and Boston Red Sox (1999). He also played for the Kintetsu Buffaloes in Nippon Professional Baseball (NPB) in 2000.

Career
Wolcott was a key member of the 1995 "Refuse to Lose" Seattle Mariner team, the first Mariner team to reach the playoffs. He was a late season call-up from the minor leagues in August, where he was most impressive in his first MLB start against the Boston Red Sox, the team with which he would pitch his final MLB game in 1999. He started Game 1 of the American League Championship Series vs the Cleveland Indians in 1995 at the age of 22. He walked the bases loaded in the 1st Inning but settled down, scattering 8 hits and 2 runs over 7 innings in a Mariners 3-2 Game 1 win.   After his season in NPB, he came back to pitch three games in the Oakland Athletics organization in 2001.

Wolcott was forced to retire due to shoulder surgery. After his baseball career ended, he continued his education at Oregon State University, where he majored in mechanical engineering.

References

External links

1973 births
Living people
American expatriate baseball players in Canada
American expatriate baseball players in Japan
Arizona Diamondbacks players
Baseball players from California
Bellingham Mariners players
Boston Red Sox players
Calgary Cannons players
Lancaster JetHawks players
Major League Baseball pitchers
Modesto A's players
Nippon Professional Baseball pitchers
Oregon State University alumni

Osaka Kintetsu Buffaloes players
Pawtucket Red Sox players
Port City Roosters players
Riverside Pilots players
Seattle Mariners players
Sportspeople from Huntington Beach, California
Tacoma Rainiers players
Tucson Sidewinders players